Molla Vali (also Romanized as Mollā Valī) is a village in Chaharduli Rural District, in the Central District of Asadabad County, Hamadan Province, Iran. At the 2006 census, its population was 168, in 37 families.

References 

Populated places in Asadabad County